László Tieber (born 30 August 1949) is a retired Hungarian footballer. During his club career, Tieber played for Székesfehérvári MÁV Előre SC, Budapest Honvéd, Videoton FC, Siófoki Bányász and USC Kirschschlag. He made 2 appearances for the Hungary national team, scoring 2 goals.

External links

1949 births
Living people
Hungarian footballers
Association football forwards
Fehérvár FC players
Budapest Honvéd FC players
Hungary international footballers